Hans Berndt Åke Thelning (24 October 1892 – 16 February 1979) was a Swedish Army officer and horse rider who competed in the 1924 Summer Olympics. He and his horse Löke finished sixth in the individual jumping event and won a gold medal with the Swedish jumping team. Later in the 1930 he worked as a senior teacher at a riding school in Copenhagen.

Ståhle became ryttmästare in the reserve in 1928.

Awards and decorations
  Knight of the Order of the Sword (1942)

References

1892 births
1979 deaths
Swedish Army officers
Swedish male equestrians
Swedish show jumping riders
Olympic equestrians of Sweden
Equestrians at the 1924 Summer Olympics
Olympic gold medalists for Sweden
Olympic medalists in equestrian
People from Vårgårda Municipality
Medalists at the 1924 Summer Olympics
Knights of the Order of the Sword
Sportspeople from Västra Götaland County